Miran Božovič (born August 12, 1957) is a Slovenian philosopher and psychoanalyst, associated with the Ljubljana school of psychoanalysis.

Božovič was born in Ljubljana. He holds a degree in comparative literature and philosophy from the University of Ljubljana, and a PhD in philosophy. He teaches early modern philosophy at the Faculty of Arts of the University of Ljubljana.

Božovič has written on several controversial subjects, including Bentham's concept of panopticon, the conceptualizations of the body in early modern philosophy, and the influence of traditional exorcist notions on Descartes' philosophy.

References 

1957 births
University of Ljubljana alumni
Academic staff of the University of Ljubljana
20th-century Slovenian philosophers
Continental philosophy
Living people
21st-century Slovenian philosophers